The 1998 Marlboro Grand Prix of Miami was a CART race which happened at the Homestead Motorsports Complex. It happened on March 15, 1998. It was the 1st round of the 1998 CART season.

Starting grid
 Greg Moore 217.541 mph / 24.856 seconds (1st CART career pole)
 André Ribeiro 214.665 mph
 Jimmy Vasser
 Christian Fittipaldi
 Adrian Fernandez
 Alex Zanardi
 Mark Blundell
 Michael Andretti
 Patrick Carpentier
 Maurício Gugelmin
 Gil de Ferran
 Scott Pruett
 Dario Franchitti
 Al Unser Jr.
 Richie Hearn
 Bryan Herta
 Bobby Rahal
 Tony Kanaan (R)
 Michel Jourdain Jr.
 Max Papis
 Paul Tracy
 Hélio Castroneves (R)
 Roberto Moreno
 Hiro Matsushita
 Dennis Vitolo (Suffered an awful crash during practice. Suffered a broken finger, but raced.)
 P. J. Jones
 Alex Barron (R)
 Arnd Meier
 JJ Lehto (No speed due to gearbox problems)

Race

Lap 27
Top 6: Greg Moore, Alex Zanardi, Michael Andretti, Christian Fittipaldi, Gil de Ferran and Adrian Fernandez.

Lap 34
First full course caution was out, as rookie Tony Kanaan had hit the wall in turn 4.

Lap 44
Green flag. de Ferran leads.

Lap 57
Top 6: Gil de Ferran, Michael Andretti, Alex Zanardi, Christian Fittipaldi, Patrick Carpentier and Scott Pruett.

Lap 67
New leader: Michael Andretti!

Lap 75
Second full course caution came out, as Paul Tracy "brushed" the wall in the backstretch.

Lap 82
Green flag. de Ferran leads, but, laps later, he lost the lead, due to a pitstop.

Lap 97
Top 6: Michael Andretti, Alex Zanardi, Gil de Ferran, Christian Fittipaldi, Dario Franchitti and Scott Pruett.

Lap 100
Third full course caution, as another 1998 rookie had "brushed" the wall in turn 1: Hélio Castroneves.

Lap 107
Green flag. Alex Zanardi leads.

Lap 116
Fourth full course caution came out as Mark Blundell was another victim of the wall. This time in turn 2.

Lap 117
Top 6: Andretti, Zanardi, Moore, Fittipaldi, Pruett and Fernandez.

Lap 122
Green flag. Andretti once again was leading the race.

Lap 130
Fifth full course caution: Hiro Matsushita had hit the wall in turn 2.

Lap 140
Green flag. Andretti leads.

Race results

Final results
Top 12

 Michael Andretti 150 Laps
 Greg Moore
 Alex Zanardi
 Christian Fittipaldi
 Scott Pruett
 Adrian Fernandez
 Gil de Ferran
 Bryan Herta
 Dario Franchitti
 Maurício Gugelmin
 Patrick Carpentier
 Mark Blundell

Drivers who did not completed the race
 Al Unser Jr. +28 Transmission
 Hiro Matsushita +29 Contact
 Hélio Castroneves (R) +53 Contact
 Dennis Vitolo +60 Withdrawn due to injury
 Max Papis +67 Wheel bearing
 Paul Tracy +71 Suspension
 Michel Jourdain Jr. +72 Handling
 Tony Kanaan (R) +118 Contact

Point standings
Top 6
 Andretti 21 points
 Moore 17 points
 Zanardi 14 points
 Fittipaldi 12 points
 Pruett 10 points
 Fernandez 8 points

Notes
 (R) denotes contender for Rookie of the Year award
 For this race, the Homestead-Miami Speedway was reconfigured for the third time in three years. In the summer of 1997, an $8.2 million reconfiguration project changed the turns from a rectangle to a traditional, continuous turn oval.
 First pole: Greg Moore

References

Homestead–Miami Indy 300
Marlboro Grand Prix Of Miami, 1998
1998 in sports in Florida